Hsiao Shu-li (born 1 March 1967) is a Taiwanese politician.

Career
Hsiao was a member of the third National Assembly elected from Chiayi, where her family has enjoyed strong political support. After the end of her term, Hsiao led the Chiayi City Farmers’ Cooperative Association. In 2006, she contested a party primary for a legislative by-election, ending her candidacy to support . She sought the Kuomintang nomination for the mayoralty of Chiayi in 2014, though the party chose to back . Subsequently, Hsiao planned to seek the mayoralty as an independent, but later ended her campaign. She was instead elected speaker of Chiayi City Council, a post once held by her uncle .  After winning the municipal election, Hsiao rejoined the Kuomintang. She was named a deputy secretary-general of the party in April 2016. Hsiao withdrew from the party for a second time in February 2018, announcing that she would again run for the Chiayi City mayorship. She was formally expelled from the Kuomintang in September 2018.

References

External links
 

1967 births
Living people
21st-century Taiwanese women politicians
21st-century Taiwanese politicians
Kuomintang politicians in Taiwan
Politicians of the Republic of China on Taiwan from Chiayi
Expelled members of the Kuomintang